Muttama is a rural community in the central east part of the Riverina.  It is situated by road, about 24 kilometres south of Cootamundra and 17 kilometres north of Coolac.

The name Muttama is derived from the local Aboriginal word meaning "like it" or "take it".

Mining in the area began in the 1860s and Muttama prospered with the discovery of gold at Muttama Reef in 1882. Muttama Reef Post Office opened on 1 February 1876, was renamed Muttama in 1889, and closed on 12 October 1979. The village was served by a railway station on the Tumut branch from 1886 to 1975, when passenger services were discontinued. All goods traffic on line was suspended after flooding in 1984.

References

External links

 Muttama Railway Siding

Towns in the Riverina
Towns in New South Wales
Cootamundra-Gundagai Regional Council
Mining towns in New South Wales